Clifford L. Ashburn (November 21, 1905 – November 9, 1989) was an American football player. After playing college football for the Nebraska Cornhuskers, Ashburn played in the National Football League (NFL) for the New York Giants in 1929.

References

External links
 

1905 births
1989 deaths
American football ends
American football guards
American football tackles
Nebraska Cornhuskers football players
New York Giants players
People from Tilden, Nebraska
Players of American football from Nebraska
People from Scottsbluff, Nebraska